Mr Gay World 2012, the 4th Mr Gay World pageant, was held at The Lyric Theatre, in Gold Reef City, Johannesburg, South Africa on April 8, 2012. François Nel of South Africa crowned his successor, Andreas Derleth of New Zealand. 25 countries and territories competed for the title.

Results

Special awards

Judges
Briand Bedford - Editor in Chief -Spartacus International Gay Guide (Germany);
Eric Butter - President of Mr. Gay World Ltd.(Australia & Republic of El Salvador);
Andrew Craig - Founding Editor DNA Magazine. (Australia);
Frank Malaba - Actor/Human Rights Activist/Playwright Poet/Radio Producer/Host. (Zimbabwe);
Dr. Pubern Padayachee - Indian medical doctor/TV presenter/part-time Bollywood actor. (India & South Africa);
Remco Teppema - Co-founder/co-publisher of the gay publications Winq and Mate Magazine. (The Netherlands);
Mr. Terry Tucker - Geoscientist/senior executive. (Canada).

Contestants

References 

2012 beauty pageants
2012 in South Africa
Beauty pageants in South Africa
2012
2012 in LGBT history
April 2012 events in Africa
2010s in Johannesburg